Edward M. Lawson (born September 24, 1929 – February 29, 2016) was a Canadian former trade unionist and politician.

Born in Gerald, Saskatchewan, Lawson was the second longest-serving member of the Senate of Canada, and the longest-serving senator to be appointed by Prime Minister Pierre Trudeau when he retired upon reaching the age of 75 on September 24, 2004. He was appointed on October 7, 1970 as an independent. He represented the city of Vancouver, British Columbia, and is the former Canadian director of the International Brotherhood of Teamsters. Lawson served as an independent Senator until 2003 when he joined the Liberal Party of Canada following the election of Paul Martin as party leader.

References

External links 
 

1929 births
2016 deaths
Canadian senators from British Columbia
Independent Canadian senators
Liberal Party of Canada senators
21st-century Canadian politicians